In molecular biology, glycoside hydrolase family 43 is a family of glycoside hydrolases.

Glycoside hydrolases  are a widespread group of enzymes that hydrolyse the glycosidic bond between two or more carbohydrates, or between a carbohydrate and a non-carbohydrate moiety. A classification system for glycoside hydrolases, based on sequence similarity, has led to the definition of >100 different families. This classification is available on the CAZy web site, and also discussed at CAZypedia, an online encyclopedia of carbohydrate active enzymes.

Glycoside hydrolase family 43 CAZY GH_43 includes enzymes with the following activities, beta-xylosidase, alpha-L-arabinofuranosidase; arabinanase, and xylanase. The structure of arabinanase Arb43A from Cellvibrio japonicus reveals a five-bladed beta-propeller fold. A long V-shaped groove, partially enclosed at one end, forms a single extended substrate-binding surface across the face of the propeller.

References 

EC 3.2.1
GH family
Protein families